The Way of a Maid is a surviving 1921 American silent comedy-drama film produced by Selznick Pictures and starring Elaine Hammerstein. It was released by Select Pictures and directed by William P. S. Earle from an original story for the screen. A print of the film is held by the Library of Congress.

Plot
As described in a film magazine, successful candy salesman Tom Lawlor (Welch) returns to his hotel room and finds it in disorder. Mistaking the young society woman Naida Castleton (Hammerstein), entering the room across the hall from his, for a maid, Tom orders her to make his bed. She keenly enjoys the joke and keeps up the deception as "Marie", and afterwards when Tom's mother Mrs. Lawlor (Lindroth) asks her to become her secretary, Naida accepts the position when her fortune has been swept away. Tom falls in love with her. Naida is sent to Newport to open up a summer home the Lawlor's have recently purchased, one which formerly belonged to Naida's family, her friends descend on her and she is forced to disclose her identity to Tom and his family. She accepts Tom, however, when she finds that he loves her just as much as Naida, society swell, as Marie the maid.

Cast

References

External links

Lantern slide

1921 films
American silent feature films
Films based on short fiction
1921 comedy-drama films
1920s English-language films
American black-and-white films
Films directed by William P. S. Earle
Selznick Pictures films
1920s American films
Silent American comedy-drama films